The men's 200 metre freestyle event at the 2015 Southeast Asian Games took place on 6 June 2015 at the OCBC Aquatic Centre in Singapore.

There were 13 competitors from seven countries who took part in this event. Two heats were held. The heat in which a swimmer competed did not formally matter for advancement, as the swimmers with the top eight times from both field qualified for the finals.

Records
Prior to this competition, the existing Asian and Games records were as follows:

The following records were established during the competition:

Schedule
All times are Singapore Standard Time (UTC+08:00)

Results

Heats 

The first round was held on 6 June.

Final 

The final was held on 6 June.

References

External links

Men's 200 metre freestyle